A cordial is a type of confection in which liquid filling is placed within a chocolate shell. A well known confectionery of this type is the cherry cordial (a type of chocolate-covered cherry).

Process
The liquid center found in some cordials is made using invertase to hydrolyze sucrose in the filling, a process that can take up to two weeks. This makes it a requirement to age the cordials in storage before consuming them to ensure the filling has become liquid. Some fillings include cherry, strawberry, raspberry and blueberry.

See also
 List of chocolate-covered foods

References

Confectionery
Chocolate-covered foods